Jane Kent (born 1952) is an American artist. Her work is included in the collections of the Whitney Museum of American Art, The RISD Museum and the Smithsonian American Art Museum.

References

External links
Official website

1952 births
Living people
20th-century American women artists
Artists from New York (state)
21st-century American women